Love Song is an album containing songs sung by Riya from Eufonius first released on August 31, 2005 in Japan by Key Sounds Label bearing the catalog number KSLA-0019. The album contains one disc with thirteen tracks composed and produced by Jun Maeda of Key. Additional participating musicians include Kendi Sato on electric guitar for tracks two and twelve, AchillesKEN on percussion for track seven, and Weisswurst on violin for tracks seven and thirteen. Cover art for the album was provided by Yoshitoshi ABe who also provided illustrations inside the album's booklet. Love Song is a concept album which tells the narrative of love as it heads toward ruin.

Track listing

Legacy
The fifth track  heavily sampled the background music track  from Key's 2000 visual novel Air, which was also written by Jun Maeda. The thirteenth track "Love Song" was later featured as a remixed background music version in Key's 2005 visual novel Tomoyo After: It's a Wonderful Life; this version later appeared on the Tomoyo After Original Soundtrack, along with a piano version. A different piano version of "Love Song" appeared on the Clannad and Tomoyo After remix album Piano no Mori. A remixed version of "Love Song" combined with the track "Memories" from the Tomoyo After Original Soundtrack appeared on the remix album Key 10th Memorial Fes Anniversary CD. Both "Love Song" and "Memories" are written by Jun Maeda. The fourth track  was heavily sampled for Saya's leitmotif  from Key's 2008 visual novel Little Busters! Ecstasy. A cover of the seventh track  sung by Vocaloid Hatsune Miku was included on Key+Vocaloid Best selection vol.1 released by Key Sounds Label in May 2012. The sixth track  was sampled for music tracks for The Day I Became a God original soundtrack.

References

External links
Key Sounds Label's official website 

2005 albums
Concept albums
Riya albums
Key Sounds Label